The 1932 Pacific hurricane season ran through the summer and fall of 1932. Before the satellite age started in the 1960s, data on east Pacific hurricanes was extremely unreliable. Most east Pacific storms were of no threat to land.

Systems

Hurricane One
A tropical cyclone formed in the Gulf of Tehuantepec on June 18. It moved along the coast, became a hurricane, and was last seen June 21. The lowest pressure was an uncorrected . This hurricane was reported to have winds of 130 mph.

Tropical Storm Two
On August 21, tropical cyclone was heading northwestward south of the Revillagigedo Islands.

Hurricane Three
Between August 25 and 27, a "tropical hurricane" formed offshore southern Mexico, and moved north-northwest into southwest Mexico east of Manzanillo before dissipating.

Hurricane Four
Somewhere southwest of the Gulf of Tehuantepec, a tropical cyclone formed on September 24. It paralleled the coast, and intensified into a hurricane on September 25. It then recurved, and made landfall near Mazatlán late during the night of September 26 and 27, while still a hurricane. It dissipated inland over the mountains of Mexico. The hurricane caused about $5,000,000 (1932 USD) in damage.

Hurricane Five
On September 26, a hurricane was spotted south of Acapulco. It headed along the coast, and entered the Gulf of California sometime on or after September 28, wherein it moved north-northwest and dissipated, with its remnants continuing into the Southwestern United States.

Powerful winds in Mazatlán were attributed to this system. Over a seven-hour period,  fell at Tehachapi. That total by itself is enough to make this tropical cyclone one of California's wettest tropical storm. Those rains also caused flash flooding on Tehachapi and Agua Caliente Creeks, which killed fifteen people.

See also

1932 Atlantic hurricane season
1932 Pacific typhoon season
1930s North Indian Ocean cyclone seasons
 1900–1940 South Pacific cyclone seasons
 1900–1950 South-West Indian Ocean cyclone seasons
 1930s Australian region cyclone seasons

References

1932 in Mexico
Pacific hurricane seasons
1930s Pacific hurricane seasons